

Athens

 Athens College 
 Arsakeia Schools
 American Community Schools
 Byron College
 Costeas-Geitonas School
 Campion School
 Doukas School
 Ecole Jeanne D' Arc - Piraeus
 Geitonas School
 German School of Athens (DSA)
 International School of Athens
 Kessaris School
 Lycee Franco-Hellenique
 Lycee Leonin, Patissia & Nea Smyrni
 Moraitis School
 Pierce College - American College of Greece 
 Peiramatiko Lyceum Anavryton (aka Anavryta) Protypo School
 St Lawrence College, Athens 
 St. Catherine's British Embassy School
 Ionideios Model School Of Piraeus
 5th Junior High School of Nea Smyrni
 3rd General High School of Kifissia
 3rd (General) High School of Paleo Faliro

Chios
 Tsakos Enhanced Education Nautical School (TEENS; Private Vocational Nautical High School), Chios

Ioannina
 Zosimaia School

Larissa
 The International Community School of Larissa

Patras
 1st High School of Patras, there are also other 12 Public High Schools.
 13th High School of Patras
 Arsakeio High School Of Patras
 Peiramatiko Lyceum Patras Patras University, High School
 7th EPAL Patras
 Music High School Of Patras

Thessaloniki
 The American Farm School of Thessaloniki
 Anatolia College (American College of Thessaloniki)
 De La Salle, Greek-French College
 Aristotelio Kollegio
 Arsakeio Highschool and Lyceum of Thessaloniki
 French school MLF of Thessaloniki
 German School of Thessaloniki
 Hellenic College Thessaloniki
 Kalamari Greek-french School
 Korais (Κοραής) Thessaloniki School, Peraia, Thessaloniki
 Mandoulides Schools
 Peiramatiko Lyceum
 Pinewood International School of Thessaloniki
 Vassiliadis School of Thessaloniki
 1st EPAL Chalastras
 1st General Lyceum Chalastras

References

Greece
Greece
Schools
Schools
Schools